Parewadi is a village in the Karmala taluka of Solapur district in Maharashtra state, India.

Demographics
Covering  and comprising 364 households at the time of the 2011 census of India, Parewadi had a population of 1828. There were 968 males and 860 females, with 226 people being aged six or younger.

References

Villages in Karmala taluka